The 1996–97 EHF Women's Champions League was the fourth edition of the modern era of the 1961-founded competition for European national champions women's handball clubs, running from 10 October 1996 to 10 May 1997. The competition system was reformed, as the group stage was expanded from 8 to 16 teams, now replacing the Round of 16, and the quarter-finals and semifinals were reestablished.

Mar Valencia defeated Viborg HK in the final to become the first Spanish team to win the competition. Defending champion Podravka Koprivnica was defeated by the Danish in the quarter-finals.

Qualifying round

Group stage

Group A

Group B

Group C

Group D

Quarter-finals

Semifinals

Final

References

Women's EHF Champions League
Ehf Women's Champions League, 1996-97
Ehf Women's Champions League, 1996-97
EHF
EHF